"F.L.M." is a 1987 hit song that became the third single released by British pop duo Mel and Kim. The song was written and produced by Stock Aitken Waterman, and peaked at number seven on the UK Singles Chart. The song was the title track to F.L.M., their debut album, and was remixed for its single release.

The song title is an acronym for "fun, love and money", but was actually a play on the sisters' frequent use of the expression "fucking lovely mate" during the recording sessions for the album.

Due to Mel being diagnosed with a recurrence of cancer in June 1987, the duo did not appear in the promotional music video for the song. Instead, a number of versions of the clip were compiled, variously using footage of the sisters' live performance of "F.L.M" and the music videos for "Showing Out (Get Fresh at the Weekend)" and "Respectable", with all cuts featuring a male actor playing the role of a detective, and string puppets resembling the duo. 

Kim Appleby said she was "devastated" by the finished video, having not been consulted on its contents, and only seeing it for the first time when it was aired on TV. Kim, who said that her sister Mel was equally dissatisfied with the video, added that she would have preferred that no video was released at all. Supreme Records head Nick East described the video as a "mistake."

"F.L.M." would be the penultimate international single released by the duo.

UK releases
 7" (SUPE 113)
 "F.L.M."
 "F.L.M." (instrumental/Senza Voce)

 12" (SUPE T 113)
 "F.L.M." (Extended mix)
 "F.L.M." (Club mix)
 "F.L.M." ([original] Dub mix)

 12" picture disc (SUPE TP 113)
 "F.L.M." (Extended mix)
 "F.L.M." (Club mix)
 "F.L.M." ([original] Dub mix)

 12" remix (SUPE TX 113)
 "F.L.M." (Two Grooves Under One Nation remix/Chic Le Freak mix)
 "F.L.M." ([Two Grooves Under One Nation] Dub mix)

 Cassette single (CSUPE113)
 "F.L.M." (Auto Mix)
 "Showing Out/Respectable" Megamix
 "F.L.M." (7" version)

Official mixes
 Album Version 3:55
 7" Version 3:33
 Instrumental/Senza Voce 3:35
 Extended Mix 7:50
 Club Mix 5:37
 [original] Dub Mix 4:00
 Auto Mix 7:24
 Sonic Remix 6:20
 Phil Harding Mix 9:15
 Beat Boys Mix 9:37
 Beat Boys Dub 4:48
 Two Grooves Under One Nation 7" Mix 3:53
 Two Grooves Under One Nation Remix/Chic Le Freak Mix) 8.10 – mixed with Chic's Le Freak
 [Two Grooves Under One Nation] Dub mix 4:30

Chart positions

Parody
In their 1988 song parodying the formulaic music of Stock Aitken Waterman, "This Is the Chorus", Morris Minor and the Majors joked that "F.L.M." stood for "fun, love, and monotony."

References

1987 singles
Mel and Kim songs
Songs written by Pete Waterman
Songs written by Matt Aitken
Songs written by Mike Stock (musician)
Song recordings produced by Stock Aitken Waterman
Supreme Records singles
1987 songs